The human cannonball act is a performance in which a person who acts as the "cannonball" is ejected from a specially designed cylinder that has been designed to resemble a cannon. The human cannonball lands on a horizontal net or inflated bag placed at the landing point, as predicted by physics. Outdoor performances may aim at a body of water.

History

The first "human" cannonball, launched in 1877 at the Royal Aquarium in London, was a 17-year-old girl called "Zazel", whose real name was Rossa Matilda Richter. She was launched by a spring-style cannon invented by the Canadian William Leonard Hunt ("The Great Farini"). She later toured with the P.T. Barnum Circus. Farini's cannon used rubber springs to launch a person from the cannon, limiting the distance they could be launched. Richter's career as a human cannonball ended when she broke her back during an unrelated tightrope act.

In the 1920s, Ildebrando Zacchini invented a cannon that used compressed air to launch a human cannonball. Zacchini shot his son Hugo Zacchini out of the compressed air cannon. Members of the Zacchini family were later inducted into the Ringling Brothers Circus Hall of Fame.

World record
The distance was measured from the mouth of the cannon to the farthest point reached on the net. Smith was launched by an 8 m (26' 3") long cannon. It was estimated that he traveled at a speed of 120 km/h (74.6 mph), reaching a maximum altitude of 23 m (75' 6").

It is estimated that Smith Sr. traveled at over  during the flight.

Recently 
Circus performer Bello Nock performed a human cannonball stunt involving him flying over the main rotor of a helicopter during the ninth episode of the twelfth season of America’s Got Talent.

Cannon
The impetus in the cannon is provided either by a spring or jet of compressed air. This makes the device work more like a catapult, where the cylinder propelling the human stops at the mouth of the cannon. Some cannons utilize nitrocellulose, specifically the dinitrate ester, cellulose dinitrate (pyroxylin).

In a circus performance, gunpowder may be used to provide visual and auditory effects unrelated to the launching mechanism. Fireworks and smoke may also be used to increase the visual effect.

The largest retailer of these human cannons is located in Greensburg, Pennsylvania. This supplier provides approximately 80% of all human cannon catapults.

Risk
More than 30 human cannonballs have died during the performance of this stunt. Among the latest was that which occurred in Kent, United Kingdom on April 25, 2011, where a human cannonball died as a result of the failure of the safety net.  Landing is considered to be the most dangerous aspect of the act.

Special forces
The human cannonball principle is the subject of a patent application by the US Defense Advanced Research Projects Agency, whereby a rail-guided chair driven by compressed air is brought to a sudden stop, propelling the special forces member, police officer or firefighter onto the roof of a tall building.

See also 
 Frank "Cannonball" Richards
 William Leonard Hunt
 Ildebrando Zacchini
 Zacchini v. Scripps-Howard Broadcasting Co.
 Cannonball ride – a plot device used for example in the tales about Baron Munchausen and in the 1911 film The Adventures of Pinocchio

References

Further reading 

 Shane Peacock. The Great Farini: The High-Wire Life of William Hunt (1995), .
 Richard Hooper. Flight of the human cannonballs, BBC News Magazine, BBC World Service, 3 September 2013 (with photos).

External links 

 The Human Cannonball in Action (video) 
 BBC News article on being a human cannonball
 BBC News article on a female human cannonball
 The Straight Dope page about human cannonballs
 Human Cannonball (song by Loudon Wainwright III)

Circus skills
Shooting sports